The 5th Lagos State House of Assembly is the legislative branch of the Lagos State Government inaugurated on June 2, 2003 and the assembly ran its course till July 2, 2007. 
The assembly was unicameral with 41 representatives elected from each constituencies of the state.
The Speaker of the 5th Legislative Assembly was Rt. Hon Adeyemi Ikuforiji and the Deputy speaker was Hon. Farouk Adegboyega Oshodi.

References

1979 establishments in Nigeria
State lower houses in Nigeria
Lagos State House of Assembly